Dan Taulapapa McMullin (born May 23, 1957) is an American Samoan artist, known for his poetry, visual art and film. His major themes are his indigenous Samoan heritage and his fa'afafine gender identity. McMullin has been creating literary and artistic works for over 35 years, and has received numerous awards, fellowships, and grants. He works in a variety of literary styles and visual art modes. In his adult life, he has spent time in Los Angeles (where he worked for many years), and now live with his partner in Laguna, California, and Hudson, New York.

Childhood and education
McMullin was born in Japan into a military family, and spent his toddler years in Germany, before moving to American Samoa as a young child where he was raised on Tutuila Island in the villages of Maleola and Leone.
 He is of Samoan and Jewish-Irish descent. His childhood home on Samoa has been described as "a traditional Samoan fale roundhouse with coral stone flooring and sugarcane thatching, brought up making indigenous siapo barkcloth painting by his great-grandmother Fa'asapa." He received his MFA from Claremont Graduate University and his BA from University of California, Irvine. He spent much of his professional career in television, film, and theater, before leaving those industries to focus on poetry and his own art. He has taught both poetry and painting at the University of the South Pacific, for the California Arts Council, for the American Samoa Arts Council and the American Samoan Humanities Council.

Gender and heritage
McMullin's indigenous heritage and queer identity are central to his artistic work, as both themes and sources of inspiration. In a 2013 interview, when asked which non-artist most influences his work, he replied: "My old man, my boyfriend, usually in bed after yadda yadda, looking out the windows at the hills of Laguna, California where we are. It's moments like that I'm back in Samoa again, my soul is; and ideas come easily, like mangoes hitting a tin roof in the rain."

McMullin identifies as fa'afafine, a Samoan third gender for which there is no exact English translation, but which is often described as a man who lives as a woman. McMullin generally uses male pronouns, including on his own website. Describing fa'afafine in an artist statement introducing his poetry and photography for the USC Cinema journal Spectator, McMullin writes:

McMullin, in an artist's statement in June 2016, said "Often, not always, but often my work looks at sexuality and the body. The body as memory, a key to our historical presences, to my own story and my oratory. There is a great cleft and an eternal return to the past, but the past is only a way to continue the journey into the future.  A looking back as a way of setting the sale toward whatever my own indigenous futurism defines."

McMullin has written personal narratives reflecting on both his gender and indigenous identity. In a 2011 essay for the Amerasia Journal he explores what it means to be Fa'afafine, both from a personal and historical context. In an essay for The Poetry Foundation blog, McMullin says "Identity is not something we claim, it is something that claims us."

Creative works

Writing
McMullin's poetry and essays have been primarily published in anthologies focused on LGBTQ or Pacific Island indigenous literature. McMullin's first full-length poetry collection, Coconut Milk (2013) was named in the American Library Association's Over the Rainbow top-ten overall category.

McMullin's more experimental poetry, such as his poetry published in Poetry Magazine in 2016, often blends the boundaries between poetry, visual poetry, and visual art. For instance, his poem "The Doors of the Sea":

Before the publication of Coconut Milk, McMullin had already been widely published, and his solo collections included a poetry chapbook, A Drag Queen Named Pipi (2004) from Tinfish Press and a children's book My Name is Laloifi (2005).

Visual art
McMullin began making visual art around 2004 while living in Apia Samoa. Around 2011 or slightly earlier, he began to explore the concept of the cultural appropriation of Samoan art and culture, or Tiki Kitsch as it is sometimes called. Much of his work since that time has been influenced by this shift. In a 2012 artist statement McMullin writes:

In addition to painting, McMullin also does a significant amount of work in sculpture, collage, installation and photography.  McMullin's work has been featured in over a dozen solo exhibits – including installations at the American Museum of Natural History in New York (2016) and at the De Young Museum in San Francisco (2010) – and in over 50 group exhibitions across the United States.

In a 2010 interview as artist in residence at de Young, McMullin discussed the physical make up of his works, as well as how the many media in which he works organically influence each other:

Film
Of McMullin's three short films Sinaela has received the most acclaim, and has been shown at film festivals internationally including Australia and New Zealand. It was filmed on a hand held camera in American Samoa, and draws on the fairy tale Cinderella as well as a Samoan proverbial tale (a fa'agogo). Since Sinaela, McMullin also made the films ULA: The Garland which was shown in 2011 in New Zealand at the Pacific Art Summit as a work in progress, and 100 Tikis, a short film on the theme of cultural appropriation.

List of recent and notable exhibitions, publications, awards and honors

Source

Writing (fiction, poetry, and essays)
 2016: Over My Queer Samoan Body published on The Poetry Foundation’s website
 2016: Pacific Islander Portfolio published in Poetry Magazine
 2014: Essay "Tiki Manifesto" published in anthology Huihui: Navigating Art and Literature in the Pacific by University of Hawai'i Press
 2013: Coconut Milk, McMullin’s first full length poetry collection published by University of Arizona Press
 2012: Poems published in “Tiki Kitsch" Pacific Art Association Journal 
 2011: Poems published in Sovereign Erotics, anthology of LGBTQ indigenous writers
 2010: Short story "Monsieur Cochon" published in The Contemporary Pacific by University of Hawai'i Press
 2005: My Name is Laloifi a children’s book published by Learning Media Limited of New Zealand
 2004: A Drag Queen Named Pipi, poetry chapbook published by Tinfish Press
 2002: Short story published in One Story Magazine #10 (New York)

Art exhibitions
 2016: American Museum of Natural History, New York City, NY
 2016 Los Angeles Public Art Biennial, LA: Water, Los Angeles, CA (group exhibition)
 2016: Rose Gallery, Hudson, NY
 2015: Oakland Museum of California, Oakland, CA (group exhibition)
 2015: University of Laverne Gallery, Ontario, Canada (group exhibition)
 2014: University of Hawaii Manoa, Hawaii, NY
 2013: East Gallery Claremont Graduate University, Claremont, CA
 2011: Gorman Museum, Davis, CA
 2010: De Young Museum, San Francisco, CA
 2010: Pacific Islander Ethnic Museum, Long Beach, CA
 2010: University of Michigan, Ann Arbor, MI
 2010: McCarthy Gallery, Parnell, Auckland, New Zealand
 2008: Boomali Gallery, Sydney, Australia

Film
 2016: 100 Tikis, shown at the Autochone Montreal Film Festival (Canada) and the Wairoa Maori Film Festival
 2011: Ula: The Garland, shown at the Pacific Arts Summit Square Eyes Film Festival, New Zealand
 2001: Sinaela, winner of best short film at the Honolulu Rainbow Film Festival 
 2002: the International Lesbian and Gay Film Festival (San Francisco), 
 2002: Outfest (Los Angeles)
 2002: Homo-a-Gogo (Seattle)
 2003: Mardi Gras Film Festival (Sydney, Australia), 
 2003: Visual Communications Film Festival 
 2003: New Festival (New York)
 2016: Auckland Art Gallery (New Zealand)

Awards and honors
 2014: Coconut Milk named one of the American Library Association's Over the Rainbow Top-Ten Books for 2013
 2010: Recipient of the Arts & Humanities Award from the University of California at Irvine
 2002: Sinaela won Best Short Film Award at The Honolulu Rainbow Film Festival
 1997: Poets&Writers Award from The Writer's Loft
 1989: Nominated for an Emmy from the Academy of Television Arts & Sciences for the L.A. Area

Residencies, fellowships and grants
 American Samoa Arts & Humanities Artist Residencies
 Asian American Theatre Company Playwright in Residence
 Bates College Artist-in-Residence
 Corporation for Public Broadcasting Writers Guild of America Indigenous Screenwriters Lab
 De Young Museum Artist-in-Residence
 Djerassi Artist Colony
 Gay Games Indigenous Arts Festival 
 Jerome Playwrights Fellowship
 Jerome McKnight Travel Fellowship
 Keomailani Foundation PIKO Artist Residency
 Mid-Atlantic Millennium Residency
 California Arts Council Artist Residency
 Pacific Islanders in Communications Screenwriting Fellowship 
 University of the South Pacific Writers Residency and Artist Residency at Oceania Centre for the Arts USP
 Macmillan Brown Centre for Pacific Studies 
 Research Scholar Residency University of Canterbury
 University of California Irvine Summer Undergraduate Research Program
 University of Michigan Pacific Island Studies
 Waiariki Institute of Technology Artist-in-Residence

See also
 List of Samoans

References

External links

McMullin on the Poetry Foundation Website
Over the Rainbow Book Award
Trailer for 100 Tikis on Vimeo
Interview with McMullin
Some of McMullin's work on Academia
Watch Sinaela on Vimeo
2010 Interview with McMullin by de Young Museum

1957 births
Living people
Claremont Graduate University alumni
University of California, Irvine alumni
Academic staff of the University of the South Pacific
American Samoan artists
Fa'afafine
Samoan LGBT artists
Samoan artists
21st-century LGBT people